The following lists events that happened during 1917 in South Africa.

Incumbents
 Monarch: King George V.
 Governor-General and High Commissioner for Southern Africa: The Viscount Buxton.
 Prime Minister: Louis Botha.
 Chief Justice: James Rose Innes

Events
January
 16 – The SS Mendi, a troopship, sets sail from Cape Town to Le Havre, France, transporting 823 members of the 802nd South African Native Labour Corps.

February
 21 – The SS Mendi is struck on the starboard side by the SS Darro, an 11,000 ton liner, and sinks with the loss of 646 lives.

September
 The Industrial Workers of Africa, South Africa's first predominantly black trade union, is established in Johannesburg.

Unknown date
 The Castle of Good Hope in Cape Town is handed over to the South African Defence Force.
 Gold mining company Anglo American Corporation is founded by Ernest Oppenheimer.

Births
 27 October – Oliver Tambo, activist and revolutionary. (d. 1993)
 20 December – Petrus Hugo, Second World War fighter pilot. (d. 1986)

Deaths
 18 January – Andrew Murray, author, educationist and pastor. (b. 1828)

Railways

Railway lines opened
 5 March – Natal – Izingolweni to Harding (narrow gauge), .
 20 June – Natal – Gingindlovu to Eshowe, .

Locomotives
 Three new Cape gauge locomotive types enter service on the South African Railways (SAR):
 November – Ten Class 16B 4-6-2 Pacific type passenger steam locomotives.
 Seven Class K 4-6-4 tank locomotives that had been built for the Philippines but could not be delivered.
 At least four 2-8-2 Mikado type steam locomotives, built for the Chemins de Fer du Bas Congo à Katanga and obtained on temporary lease to alleviate the critical wartime shortage of locomotives.

References

South Africa
Years in South Africa
History of South Africa